is a Japanese politician of the Democratic Party of Japan (DPJ), member of the House of Representatives in the Diet (national legislature) during 2006-2012 and 2014–2017.

Political career 

Kazumi Ota was elected to the assembly of Chiba Prefecture in 2005 and then to the House of Representatives for the first time in 2006 during special by-elections in Chiba's 7th district. During 2009 general elections that marked DPJ's landslide victory, Ota was re-elected in Fukushima's 2nd district. She lost in 2012 national elections, got elected in 2014 and lost again in 2017.

She once worked as a hostess, which in the past would have likely ignited a scandal but has not presently done so.

References

External links 
 Official website in Japanese.

Members of the House of Representatives (Japan)
Female members of the House of Representatives (Japan)
Politicians from Chiba Prefecture
Living people
1979 births
Democratic Party of Japan politicians
21st-century Japanese politicians
21st-century Japanese women politicians